Alfred L. Hudson House is a historic home and farm located at Kenton, Kent County, Delaware.  The house dates to about 1880, and is a two-story, five bay, center hall plan frame dwelling in a blended Queen Anne / Gothic Revival style. It has a cross gable roof and a bracketed heavy roof cornice.  Also on the property are a contributing large gambrel-roofed barn, -story granary, chicken house, a milk house, machine shed and garage.

It was listed on the National Register of Historic Places in 1983.

References

Farms on the National Register of Historic Places in Delaware
Gothic Revival architecture in Delaware
Queen Anne architecture in Delaware
Houses completed in 1880
Houses in Kent County, Delaware
Kenton, Delaware
National Register of Historic Places in Kent County, Delaware